The 1981 E3 Harelbeke was the 24th edition of the E3 Harelbeke cycle race and was held on 28 March 1981. The race started and finished in Harelbeke. The race was won by Jan Raas of the TI–Raleigh team.

General classification

References

1981 in Belgian sport
March 1981 sports events in Europe
1981